Bubsheim is a municipality in the district of Tuttlingen in Baden-Württemberg in Germany.

Mayor
In January 2012 Thomas Leibinger was elected the new mayor.

References

Tuttlingen (district)
Württemberg